Balendu Dwivedi is an Indian Hindi author. Born 1 December 1975 in the Brahmapur village of Gorakhpur District in Uttar Pradesh, India. He has written a book: Madaripur Junction & it is awarded by Up Hindi sansthan in 2018. He is working on a new novel 'Via Fursatganj'. Balendu Dwivedi is a government employee and works as a District Minority Welfare Office in state of Uttar Pradesh.

Madaripur Junction
Madaripur Junction, a Hindi Novel published on 4 December 2017 by Vani Prakashan, New Delhi.

References

External links

Living people
Indian male novelists
1975 births
Novelists from Uttar Pradesh